During the Mughal Dynasty, urdubegis were the class of women assigned to protect the emperor and inhabitants of the zenana.

Because the women of the Mughal court lived sequestered under purdah, the administration of their living quarters was run entirely by women. The division of the administrative tasks was dictated largely by the vision of Akbar, who organized his zenana of over 5,000 noble women and servants. The women tasked with the protection of the zenana were commonly of Habshi, Tatar, Turk and Kashmiri origin. Kashmiri women were selected because they did not observe purdah. Many of the women were purchased as slaves, and trained for their positions.

They are mentioned as early as the reigns of Babur and Humayun, and were proficient in weapons combat, specifically lance, and archery. Mughal emperors spent a great deal of their leisure time in the zenana, and slept there at night, therefore the women assigned to protect the women's quarters were also part of the larger system in place to protect the emperor. The urdubegis of the Mughal court were very skillful warriors. In 1719 Farrukhsiyar hid in his harem, fearing for his life, and the armed guard of the mahal readied themselves for battle.

References

Mughal Harem